The 2022 Ticketmaster controversy, also known as the Ticketmaster–Taylor Swift fiasco in the mainstream media, refers to a public controversy in November 2022 over the blunders of American ticket sales company Ticketmaster in selling tickets to the U.S. leg of the Eras Tour, the 2023 concert tour by American singer-songwriter Taylor Swift.

Ticketmaster, the leading ticketing platform in the world, partnered with Swift to sell tickets to the tour. The first round of ticket on-sale for the U.S. leg began on November 18 via Ticketmaster's Verified Fan pre-sale program. Media outlets described the demand for tickets to the Eras Tour as "astronomical", with 3.5 million people registering for the program. However, within an hour of commencing, the pre-sale website crashed, with users either completely logged out or in a frozen queue. 2.4 million tickets were sold that day despite the outage, breaking the all-time record for the most concert tickets sold by an artist in a single day. Ticketmaster attributed the crash to heavy site traffic—"historically unprecedented demand with [14 million] showing up"—but users blamed poor customer service. Live Nation Entertainment, the owner of Ticketmaster, explained that Swift's "staggering" demand "overwhelmed" the website beyond its capacity. Ticketmaster eventually canceled the general on-sale due to "insufficient" inventory. Swift stated that she was promised by the company that they could handle the demand. Ticketmaster apologized to Swift and her fans via social media. A large number of tickets, however, were seized by scalpers and re-listed on ticket resale websites such as StubHub.

Ticketmaster was met with widespread censure nationwide. Fans and consumer groups called the platform deceitful and alleged that the company is abusing its dominant market position. In response, several members of the U.S. Congress voiced their support to revert the 2010 merger of Ticketmaster and Live Nation, which they dubbed a monopoly experiencing no competitive pressure, leading to substandard service and higher prices for consumers. Following investigations initiated by several state attorneys general, the U.S. Department of Justice was reported to have opened a federal probe into the companies. Swift's tour promoter, AEG Presents, said Ticketmaster had exclusive deals with the majority of U.S. live venues, coercing AEG into working with Ticketmaster. In December 2022, several fans sued Live Nation-Ticketmaster for intentional deception, fraud, price fixing, violations of antitrust law and various other laws. The U.S. Senate Judiciary Committee examined the merger and fiasco with a hearing in January 2023.

Various publications noted that the controversy brought the spotlight on one of the longstanding issues in the music industry. Additionally, Ticketmaster distributed invalid tickets for World's Hottest Tour of Puerto Rican rapper Bad Bunny in Mexico City, which also led to overcrowding at the venue. The PROFECO, Mexico's consumer protection agency, fined Ticketmaster 10 percent of its 2021 income.

Background

Company 
Ticketmaster Entertainment, Inc. is an American ticket sales and distribution company based in Beverly Hills, California with operations in many countries around the world. It was founded in Phoenix, Arizona in 1976 by college staffers Peter Gadwa and Albert Leffler, as well as businessman Gordon Gunn III.

In 1994, American rock band Pearl Jam filed a complaint with the antitrust division of the U.S. Department of Justice, claiming that Ticketmaster has a "virtually absolute monopoly on the distribution of tickets to concerts" and attempted to book its tour only at venues that did not use Ticketmaster. However, no action was taken on Ticketmaster. In the 21st century, Ticketmaster became the largest ticket sales company in the world.

In February 2009, Ticketmaster entered into an agreement to merge with the world's largest event promoter, Live Nation, to form Live Nation Entertainment. The deal was cleared by the U.S. Justice Department in January 2010 under the condition that the company sell Paciolan to Comcast Spectacor or another firm, and license its software to Anschutz Entertainment Group (AEG), its biggest competitor. The new company, which would be called Live Nation Entertainment, would also be subject to provisions for 10 years that prevented it from retaliating against venues that partnered with competing ticketing firms. Live Nation CEO Michael Rapino was named CEO of the new company.

Ticketmaster was a subject of several controversies, such as anti-competition claims, deceitful relationships with scalpers, data breach, deceptive pricing, and dynamic pricing. According to consumer organizations, Ticketmaster and Live Nation control over 70% of the primary ticketing and live event venues market. The merger has faced longstanding criticism. Earlier in 2022, both Ticketmaster and Live Nation received backlash and media attention on their dynamic pricing and "platinum" ticket model when tickets for Bruce Springsteen's and Blink-182's 2023 tours (both of which were being promoted by Live Nation) went on sale in July and October respectively, which saw fans of both acts criticize prices for random seats across the venue going for hundreds or thousands of dollars during pre-sales or right when tickets went on sale for the general public.

Taylor Swift 

American singer-songwriter Taylor Swift released her tenth studio album, Midnights, on October 21, 2022, to widespread commercial success and critical acclaim. On November 1, she announced on Good Morning America and through her social media accounts that her sixth concert tour, in support of Midnights and all of her previous albums, would be called the Eras Tour. Its U.S. leg, which initially consisted of 27 dates across 20 cities, started on March 17, 2023, in Glendale, Arizona, and will conclude on August 9, 2023, in Inglewood, California, with tickets sold via Ticketmaster. This marks Swift's first shows in the U.S. since her Reputation Stadium Tour in 2018, which broke the record for the highest grossing U.S. tour in history. Some of the dates, such as those in Glendale, were sold via SeatGeek. Following popular demand, on November 4, Swift added eight extra U.S. dates added to existing cities, bringing the total number of concerts to 35. Higher demand prompted 17 more shows to be added the following week, making the Eras Tour the biggest U.S. tour of Swift's career, with 52 dates, surpassing Reputation Stadium Tour's 38 dates.

Website crash 
The Eras Tour recorded an incredibly high demand for tickets. On November 15, Ticketmaster's website crashed following "historically unprecedented demand with millions showing up", halting the presale. In less than an hour of availability, the ticketing platform's servers were "unable to answer", with users "either completely logged out or in a queue 2,000-plus people strong that appeared frozen." Ticketmaster immediately published a statement saying they are working to fix the issues "as the site was unprepared to accommodate the sheer force of hundreds of thousands of Swift fans", and subsequently reported that "hundreds of thousands of tickets" had already been sold and postponed the remainder of the presale, including the Capital One presale to November 16. The public on-sale was later canceled due to "extraordinarily high demands on ticketing systems and insufficient remaining ticket inventory to meet that demand". The Eras Tour sold over two million tickets on its first day of presale alone, breaking the all-time record for the most concert tickets sold by an artist in a single day.

During and immediately after the website crash, Ticketmaster was widely criticized by fans and customers on social media for its ticketing model that obstructed purchasing. According to The New York Times, the ticket sale failure "broke the internet". "Ticketmaster" trended number one worldwide on various social media platforms such as Twitter and TikTok. CNN Business stated that the "astronomical" demand indicated Swift's popularity. However, Fortune and Bloomberg News attributed the criticism to Ticketmaster's "oft-confusing multistep buying process plagued with additional fees", as well as "long waits, technical problems, and poor customer service".

Responses 

Greg Maffei, chairman of Live Nation, spoke to CNBC on November 16. He claimed that Ticketmaster prepared for 1.5 million verified fans but 14 million showed up: "we could have filled 900 stadiums." In a detailed statement, Ticketmaster explained that 3.5 million fans pre-registered for the Verified Fan program—the largest in platform history—two million of whom were placed on the waitlist while 1.5 million were allowed to purchase first, as only "40% of invited fans actually show up and buy tickets, and most purchase an average of 3 tickets." However, the website was overwhelmed by the "staggering" number of fans as well as bots without presale codes, resulting in "3.5 billion total system requests—[four times the site's] previous peak." Therefore, Ticketmaster attempted to slow down the sale by waitlisting more customers "to stabilize the systems", which in turn prolonged the queue and waiting time. The company confirmed on November 17 that the November 18 public on-sale was canceled as well, citing inability to meet demand.

Maffei also claimed that "AEG, our competitor, who is the promoter for Taylor Swift, chose to use us because, in reality, we are the largest and most effective ticket seller in the world ... Even our competitors want to come on our platform." However, AEG rejected Maffei's claim that AEG chose to work with Ticketmaster, stating that AEG was forced to work with Ticketmaster since "Ticketmaster's exclusive deals with the vast majority of venues on the Eras Tour required us to ticket through their system."

Swift released a statement on November 18, 2022, via her Instagram story; she stated that she is "pissed off" and found the fiasco "excruciating". She asserted that she is protective of her fans and wanted to assure a quality experience and claimed that it had been difficult to "trust an outside entity with these relationships and loyalties". She noted that she was "not going to make excuses for anyone because we asked [Ticketmaster], multiple times, if they could handle this kind of demand and we were assured they could." 

Later that same day, Ticketmaster issued an apology "to Taylor and all of her fans" via their Twitter account, but remarked that "less than 5% of the tickets for the tour have been sold or posted for resale on the secondary market" such as StubHub. Ticketmaster also dismissed accusations of anti-competitive practices, noting it remains "under a consent decree with the Justice Department following its 2010 merger with Live Nation" and the absence of "evidence of systemic violations of the consent decree."

Former Ticketmaster CEO Fred Rosen was unmoved by fans' outrage, telling the Los Angeles Times: "The public brought all this on itself ... I have no sympathy for people whining about high ticket prices ... They helped create this situation where artists have to make all their money on tour. Artists and the market set the prices, and you can't pay a Motel 6 price and stay at the Four Seasons." Rosen argued that all proposed solutions risked leaving fans even worse off: "Ticketmaster got thrown under the bus because it’s easy to throw them under the bus ... There is no solution that won’t piss people off more."

Fans 

Swift's fans, known as "Swifties", were particularly upset with the fiasco, some of whom proceeded with legal action. Lawyers who were fans of Swift mobilized a grassroots group called Vigilante Legal LLC., a play on Swift's 2022 song "Vigilante Shit"; its core group consists of over 50 professionals with law, government, public relations, and computer science backgrounds—"anyone from lawyers, to people who work in finance or banking, to those with antitrust experience." The group was founded by American attorney and a fan of Swift, Blake Barnett. She reported that she had received over 1,200 responses as of November 18, 2022. Vigilante Legal also began gathering evidence from fans who experienced "discriminatory and questionable service" from Ticketmaster, including a potential violation of the Americans with Disabilities Act of 1990. The group has been collecting the complaints to bring forward to the Federal Trade Commission and the attorneys general within each U.S. state.

Voters of Tomorrow, a political activist organization led by generation Z, opened an antitrust initiative called "S.W.I.F.T." (Swifties Working to Increase Fairness from Ticketmaster) on November 17, with aims to "bring together Gen Z organizers to advocate for legislation expanding federal authority to oversee and prevent future monopolies around entertainment."

In order to evade scalpers, some fans used their "tight-knit community" across social media platforms to form accounts such as "@ErasTourResell" and "TS Tour Connect" to organize a network of spreadsheets, Google Forms, and online bulletin boards, which facilitated exchanges of tickets at face-value costs from fans who wanted to re-sell to fans who wanted to buy. Volunteers of the initiative worked through ticket submissions, verified them via screen recordings and confirmation emails, and posted out the listings of tickets. According to The New York Times, the innitiative by ErasTourResell alone has helped arrange over 1,300 ticket transactions between fans.

Lawsuits 
Barfuss v. Live Nation Entertainment Inc and Ticketmaster LLC
Another group of fans, consisting of 26 plaintiffs across the U.S., filed a lawsuit on December 2, 2022, in the Los Angeles County Superior Court, against Ticketmaster and Live Nation for "intentional deception", "fraud, price fixing and antitrust violations". It demanded a civil penalty of $2500 for every violation of the California Unfair Competition Law, alongside plaintiffs seeking the costs of legal fees, and any additional relief the court deems fit. 
Since the lawsuit was filed, about 150 more fans have expressed interest in signing on to it, according to the group's attorney, Jennifer Kinder. Kinder told The Washington Post, "Ticketmaster messed with the wrong fan base." 
The lawsuit also alleged that Ticketmaster "carved out small territories" for competitors like SeatGeek to conceal "the level of monopolistic power and control" the company has, intentionally permitted scalpers and bots to access the presale, and "gave more codes than it had tickets." 
Julie Barfuss, the lead plaintiff, said that after trying to purchase tickets numerous times unsuccessfully, Barfuss chatted with a customer service worker who told her that the system considered Barfuss a bot for attempting to buy tickets 41 times. Barfuss's card also was declined 41 times, charging her an additional sum of $14,286.70 due to the purchase attempts. 
The lawsuit also named the Los Angeles County, where Ticketmaster is headquartered, as a defendant. 
Subsequently, the court suspended the lawsuit on the grounds that the plaintiffs agreed to settle the dispute in arbitration, but the case was re-opened by the U.S. Court of Appeals for the Ninth Circuit after plaintiffs argued that they were being "misled" with an unclear arbitration agreement from Live Nation. The federal appeals court ruled that the plaintiffs have "waived their right to sue." 
Sterioff v. Live Nation Entertainment Inc and Ticketmaster LLC
 On December 20, another lawsuit, a federal class action, was filed in the U.S. District Court for the Central District of California, by a Swift fan named Michelle Sterioff, accusing Live Nation-Ticketmaster of "intentionally and purposefully" violating antitrust laws and misleading "millions of fans" into believing that they would prevent bots and scalpers from participating in the ticket sale.
 The lawsuit mentions violations of California Consumers Legal Remedies Act, Unfair Competition Law, False Advertising Law, "quasi-contract/restitution/unjust enrichment", and various others. Sterioff demanded the court for injunctive relief, statutory damages, punitive damages, and legal fees, among others. 
 In a filing on February 24, Live Nation asked the judge to dismiss the class action and instead force the plaintiff to be heard privately in arbitration, citing the federal appeals court ruling in the Barfuss suit that upheld arbitration. 
 Reuters opined that companies usually favor arbitration over cout llitigation to attempt resolving issues quickly and reduce potential damages.

Ticketstoday sale 
On December 12, 2022, Ticketmaster began mailing select registered fans—"identified as [fans] who received a boost during the Verified Fan presale but did not purchase tickets"—and notified them of a second ticket-purchasing opportunity, with which they can buy a maximum of two tickets each. Ticketmaster stated that Swift's team asked the company to create this opportunity for fans. Billboard reported that Ticketmaster opted to sell the remaining 170,000 unsold seats over four weeks through Ticketstoday, a ticketing platform that was originally built for Dave Matthews Band's fanclub in the 2000s but was later sold to Live Nation, to "significantly reduce fan wait times" and avoid high website traffic.

Political impact 

Following widespread social media posts by customers upset with the website crash, several U.S. lawmakers and consumer groups took notice of the issue.
 On November 16, 2022, Alexandria Ocasio-Cortez, a member of the U.S. House of Representatives, tweeted that Ticketmaster is a monopoly and that its merger with Live Nation Entertainment must be broken up. Ocasio-Cortez has always been a "staunch objector" to the company's merger, according to CNBC.
 Representative Bill Pascrel criticized the merger of Ticketmaster and Live Nation, and stated that he attempted to purchase tickets but was waitlisted. He also underscored that he had previously petitioned in 2021 the U.S. Attorney General, Merrick Garland, in support of "strong antitrust enforcement by the [Joe] Biden Administration", along with House members Frank Pallone, Jerry Nadler, Jan Schakowsky, and David Cicilline in a joint letter.
 Senator Richard Blumenthal also urged for a federal probe into the competition in the live venue music industry. He said the fiasco "is a perfect example of how the Live Nation/Ticketmaster merger harms consumers by creating a near-monopoly."
 Senator Amy Klobuchar, chair of the Senate Judiciary Subcommittee on Competition Policy, Antitrust and Consumer Rights, penned an open letter to the CEO of Ticketmaster, Rapino, regarding her "serious concerns" over the company's operations. She wrote, "Ticketmaster's power in the primary ticket market insulates it from the competitive pressures that typically push companies to innovate and improve their services. That can result in the types of dramatic service failures we saw this week, where consumers are the ones that pay the price."
 On November 17, the Pennsylvania Attorney General, Josh Shapiro, announced he is accepting consumer complaints regarding the issue and asked Pennsylvanians to submit their complaints on his website.
 The Tennessee Attorney General, Jonathan Skrmetti, initiated an investigation into "consumer complaints about chaos during the presale of tickets" to the tour. He said in a press conference that "a lack of competition [for Ticketmaster] has led to a poor experience and higher prices for consumers."
 On November 18, Pascrell, co-signed by 30 other House Democrats, petitioned the federal Department of Justice to open a formal investigation into the issue.
 The attorneys general of Nevada and North Carolina also began investigating Live Nation–Ticketmaster on the grounds of consumer rights violations.
 Subsequently, The New York Times stated that the Department of Justice had previously opened an antitrust investigation into Live Nation Entertainment and Ticketmaster.
 On November 19, Representative Cicilline, who chairs the House Judiciary Subcommittee on Antitrust, Commercial and Administrative Law, urged the Department of Justice to investigate and break up the companies. He tweeted that "Ticketmaster's excessive wait times and fees are completely unacceptable, as seen with today's" and "“It's no secret that Live Nation–Ticketmaster is an unchecked monopoly."
 The White House Press Secretary, Karine Jean-Pierre, declined to comment on a potential investigation into the fiasco, but stated that the U.S. President, Joe Biden, "has been crystal clear on this", quoting his comment on the issue: "capitalism without competition isn't capitalism, it's exploitation." Biden subsequently tweeted that "Millions of Americans will travel home for the holidays and will get hit with hidden 'junk' fees from airlines, hotels—maybe even tickets for a holiday show the family wants to see. It isn't right. My Administration is taking actions to reduce or eliminate these surprise fees."
 On November 23, Klobuchar and Senator Mike Lee announced that the Senate antitrust panel will hold a hearing to address Ticketmaster and Live Nation's "lack of competition in the industry". It was later announced on January 18, 2023, that the hearing is set for January 24.
 On November 29, Blumenthal and Senator Marsha Blackburn wrote a letter to the Federal Trade Commission, posing questions about the agency's "plans to fight the use of bots in ticketing", and requesting to enforce the Better Online Tickets Sales Act, which is a 2016 federal law that grants the U.S. government "the authority to crack down on those who misuse bots—software applications that are programmed to run automated tasks online—to buy large amounts of tickets for profit [...] and bans the resale of tickets bought using bots, and people who illegally sell the tickets face a $16,000 fine." The letter also highlighted the "wild" ticket prices at third-party sites, as high as $1,000 for a Bruce Springsteen concert and $40,000 for Adele, stating “preventing this type of consumer harm is exactly why Congress chose to enact the BOTS Act six years ago and why we both chose to sponsor that bill."
 On December 6, the chair of the Federal Trade Commission, Lina Khan, told on The Wall Street Journal CEO Council Summit that companies like Ticketmaster can become "too big to care", and clarified that it was the Justice Department that approved the 2010 merger. She assured that the department "continues to look at this" and added that the controversy "ended up converting more Gen Zers into anti-monopolists overnight than anything I could have done."

Senate committee hearing 
On January 24, 2023, the three-hour hearing by the Senate judiciary committee, titled "That's the Ticket: Promoting Competition and Protecting Consumers in Live Entertainment", to analyze "the long-simmering dissatisfaction over the 2010 consent decree governing the merger of Ticketmaster and Live Nation", was held at 10:00 am EST in the Hart Senate Office Building, Washington, D.C. The hearing was telecast live. Various media outlets reported that both the Democrat and Republican senators "grilled" Ticketmaster's representative, Joe Berchtold, the company's chief financial officer. The senators questioned Berchtold over Ticketmaster's monopolistic practices, policies, ticket costs, lack of transparency, lack of defense against bots, and insensitivity to music artists. Berchtold, despite apologizing for the debacle, denied accusations of monopoly and fraud, but accepted that "there are several things we could have done better—including staggering the sales over a longer period of time and doing a better job setting fan expectations for getting tickets" and continued to blame "industrial-scale ticket scalping" and "unprecedented number of bots". The witnesses prosecuting Ticketmaster included Jerry Mickelson, the president of JAM Creative Productions; and Jack Groetzinger, co-founder of SeatGeek. Live Nation cited several letters of support within its testimony, including one from American country singer Garth Brooks. Several senators also quoted Swift's lyrics in their arguments, including her 2022 single "Anti-Hero". Free Britney America, a D.C. organization that was part of the Free Britney movement, protested outside the U.S. Capitol during the hearing "in support of ending Ticketmaster-Live Nation's monopoly over the live event and ticketing industry."

Following the hearing, Billboard stated that politicians of both the political parties, who see criticizing Ticketmaster as a "winning political issue and an opportunity to reach constituents who have long complained about the ticketing giant", are more of a threat to Ticketmaster than Swift herself. According to the magazine, the senators' perspective during the hearing is that "if the Live Nation-owned platform didn't have such market dominance (around 80% of large venues in the U.S. have exclusive Ticketmaster deals), greater competition would force the company to innovate and improve its services—potentially avoiding the kinds of issues that spoiled the Swift sale", and added that Ticketmaster is widely "despised" by the public, making an "easy target for rare bipartisan political action". The Washington Post columnist Helaine Olen opined the Ticketmaster fiasco "was so bad it united the parties", whereas CNN journalist Allison Morrow, in an article titled "One Nation, Under Swift", wrote that Swift's fans have united the two parties in a way "the Founding Fathers failed to anticipate".

Media reception 
Various journalists highlighted the spotlight the controversy brought on monopolies and how it could bode well for the music industry. Fortune said the controversy "set off a fan political movement to take down Ticketmaster". Pitchfork asked, "Is there any other artist [other than Swift] who could force urgency into the federal investigation of a music industry monopoly just by going on tour?" Arwa Mahdawi wrote in The Guardian, "Swift has had an incredibly impressive career. But you know what? If she gets people to sit up and pay attention to the disgraceful state of antitrust laws in the U.S., I reckon that will be her finest achievement." Brooke Schultz of Associated Press discussed how Swift's fans magnified a website crash into a political movement and considered them an influential voter demographic during elections: "the sheer power and size of Swift's fandom has spurred conversations about economic inequality, merely symbolized by Ticketmaster". Variety noted that Ticketmaster–Live Nation did not admit culpability for the issue, "unapologetically defending itself" against federal investigation and only apologizing after "a resultant drop in Live Nation shares of nearly 8% in trading Friday (November 18, 2022)."

American concert business publication Pollstar projected Swift to gross a $728 million sum across her 52 U.S. dates and "a mind-boggling billion dollars" internationally, surpassing Ed Sheeran's all-time record with less than half of his ÷ Tour's 255 dates; it would become the first tour in history to gross a billion-dollar sum. The publication wrote, "To put it another way: if Taylor Swift was a country and its economy was solely based on ticket sales, it would be the 199th largest economy on earth, equivalent to a small Caribbean nation."

A December 2022 episode of Impact, a weekly program by Nightline on Hulu that provides "an in-depth look at the stories and issues dominating the zeitgeist" by spotlighting the "real people being impacted by the issue", titled "Taylor's Ticketmaster Disaster", focused on the controversy.

Press investigation 
On December 8, 2022, Slate published a critical discourse analysis of the controversy, and concluded that Swift's fans are right about Ticketmaster "screwing them over" for profit. Statistical data, of a sample size of over 2,200 users, showed that those who had the special Verified Fan "boosts"—including codes offered to customers who had previously bought tickets to the canceled Lover Fest and were supposed to be prioritized—were less successful in securing tickets than those who did not have any type of boosts. The report concluded "It appears boosts not only didn't help, they actively harmed", but also underscored that the boosting "worked as expected" for SeatGeek users only.

On December 12, The Wall Street Journal, "according to people familiar with the matter", published data about the crash. It said that there were 2.6 million seats for the tour, for which 3.5 million people registered through the fan program, 1.5 million of whom got the pre-sale codes, which would generally translate to 1.8 million tickets sold. Instead, 12 million unique entities, including scalper bots, visited the website that day, and gave 3.5 billion user requests to the site, leading to the crash; 2.4 million tickets were sold before the website completely crashed, and 163,300 tickets that had been allocated for the canceled general sale remain—six percentage of the total seats. The Wall Street Journal also opined that if Ticketmaster had not opened a bulk of the tickets to sale on a single day and had rather split the sale in a staggered manner over several days based on venues, similar to what the platform did for the Reputation Stadium Tour, the pre-sale would not have crashed.

On January 3, 2023, The Guardian reported that Live Nation-Ticketmaster is spending "big" on its lobbying campaign on the Department of Justice, as well as legislations aimed at "greater transparency around ticket sales."

On January 23, The Los Angeles Times published an article titled "How Ticketmaster became the most hated name in music", in which it claimed that a "high-ranking concert executive", speaking on condition of anonymity, stated that "Ticketmaster erred in placing all the Eras tickets on sale at once and allowing fans to pick their own seats, which led to bottlenecked traffic" and that "the Verified Fan database was rife with resellers with fake email addresses."

Legacy 
Forbes and The Hollywood Reporter named Swift as one of 2022's most powerful women in entertainment. Entertainment Weekly listed "Swifties vs. Ticketmaster" as one of the biggest pop culture moments of 2022. The magazine's Allaire Nuss wrote, "If there was ever an artist with enough pop-culture prowess to bring down the music industry's most hated monopoly, it's Taylor Swift." Due to the controversy, The Washington Post proclaimed that 2022 is another year Swift dominated, maintaining "an unbreakable hold on our increasingly fractured world—and its discourse—in a way that almost no one else can." Vox depicted the controversy in its year-end montage summarizing the important world events of 2022. The A.V. Club listed "Ticketmaster faces the wrath of the Swifties" as one of the 30 biggest popular culture news stories of 2022.

Aftermath 

In December 2022, Ticketmaster once again faced controversy after an "unprecedented" number of people were sold fake tickets to the Mexico City dates of the World's Hottest Tour, the 2022 concert tour by Puerto Rican rapper-singer Bad Bunny. The platform said the fake tickets "caused an unusual overcrowding [at the venue] and the intermittent operation of our system, which generated confusion and complicated entrance to the stadium, with the unfortunate consequence that some legitimate tickets were denied entry." Ricardo Sheffield, the head of Mexico's consumer protection agency, stated in a Radio Fórmula interview that Ticketmaster "will be forced to pay a fine of up to 10 percent of its earnings in 2021" and "will also have to reimburse fans the price of the tickets, plus an extra 20% of the ticket's price."

In February 2023, American singer Beyoncé announced her ninth concert tour, the Renaissance World Tour, in which she also partnered with Ticketmaster. The news created concerns on social media over Ticketmaster's reliability, with fans fearing a fiasco similar to Swift's. However, Ticketmaster released a statement claiming the demand for the Renaissance World Tour is "expected to be high" and pledged to implement a "multistep verification process" to ensure tickets are being sold to the concertgoers rather than scalpers. The company will continue to sell tickets via its Verified Fan program for the North American leg of the tour, but replace the at-large on-sale (as with Swift's case) with a staggered sale, as well as not initially scheduling a public on-sale.

For the Eurovision Song Contest 2023 in Liverpool, the European Broadcasting Union (EBU) and the host broadcaster BBC partnered with Ticketmaster. Prior to the ticket booking platform going live, many users complained that the Ticketmaster website had crashed with a 500 error. Tickets for the contest's final sold out in 36 minutes, with the remaining available shows selling out around an hour later.

See also 
 Taylor Swift sexual assault trial – a lawsuit involving Swift
 Taylor Swift masters controversy – a dispute between Swift and her former record label

Footnotes

References

2022 controversies in the United States
2022 in American music
Corporate scandals
Taylor Swift
Music controversies